Martin Binedell (born 30 July 1995) is a South African swimmer. He competed in the men's 200 metre backstroke event at the 2017 World Aquatics Championships. In 2019, he represented South Africa at the 2019 African Games held in Rabat, Morocco. He also competed in the men's 200 metre backstroke event at the 2020 Summer Olympics.

References

External links
 

1995 births
Living people
African Games gold medalists for South Africa
African Games medalists in swimming
Commonwealth Games bronze medallists for South Africa
Commonwealth Games medallists in swimming
South African male swimmers
Swimmers at the 2018 Commonwealth Games
Sportspeople from Pietermaritzburg
Male backstroke swimmers
Swimmers at the 2015 African Games
Swimmers at the 2019 African Games
African Games medalists for South Africa
Swimmers at the 2020 Summer Olympics
Olympic swimmers of South Africa
Competitors at the 2015 Summer Universiade
Competitors at the 2017 Summer Universiade
Competitors at the 2019 Summer Universiade
20th-century South African people
21st-century South African people
Medallists at the 2018 Commonwealth Games